The 2007 Malaysian Grand Prix (formally the 2007 Formula 1 Petronas Malaysian Grand Prix) was a Formula One motor race, held on 8 April 2007 at the Sepang International Circuit and the second race of the 2007 FIA Formula One World Championship. Reigning world champion Fernando Alonso won the race from second on the grid, with McLaren teammate Lewis Hamilton finishing second. This marked McLaren's first one-two finish since the 2005 Brazilian Grand Prix. Previous race winner Kimi Räikkönen finished third. Räikkönen's Ferrari teammate Felipe Massa started the race from pole position, but was passed by both McLarens in the first two corners of the first lap, eventually finishing in fifth place behind BMW's Nick Heidfeld.

The Malaysian race was the first at which the two different tyre types used during the race were differentiated by a white stripe painted into the tread of the softer type, helping spectators to understand the race strategy of each driver.

Report

Background 
Pre-race testing
The 2007 Malaysian Grand Prix was held at the Sepang International Circuit near Kuala Lumpur on 8 April, with practice and qualification for the race held on the two preceding days. It was preceded by a test session at the Sepang circuit attended by all the teams except the small Dutch team Spyker, who believed that it would not be possible to try upgrades on their car in time for the race. The test was scheduled to begin on 27 March 2007 and last for three days. Robert Kubica (BMW Sauber), Kimi Räikkönen (Scuderia Ferrari) and Lewis Hamilton (McLaren) set the fastest times on the first, second and third days of the test, respectively; the final day saw partly wet conditions. Due to the poor weather, the teams agreed to extend the testing by one day, with Heikki Kovalainen (Renault F1) fastest.
Dispute over customer cars
The issue of teams using 'customer cars', that is cars obtained from other teams, surfaced before the race when Spyker protested the Scuderia Toro Rosso (STR) team's use of cars they claimed had been designed by STR's sister team, Red Bull Racing. The Concorde Agreement, which dictates the terms by which the teams compete in the Formula One world championship, requires teams to design their own cars. The Malaysian stewards rejected the protest, with the Fédération Internationale de l'Automobile (FIA, the sport's governing body) stating that "it would be entirely inappropriate for the Stewards to involve themselves in a matter being dealt with at the instigation and election of the Protestor, Spyker". Red Bull threatened legal action over Spyker's possession of their car designs to use as evidence against STR, but nothing materialised. The FIA did not investigate how Spyker obtained Red Bull's car designs.
Flexible floors
The FIA introduced more stringent tests on the cars at the Malaysian race to ensure floor mounting systems used by Ferrari and BMW Sauber were not in breach of the regulations. After the first race of the season in Australia, the McLaren team had requested clarification of the rules regarding systems that allowed the front of the car's undertray to move upwards under aerodynamic loading at high speed. Autosport magazine reported that this movement would potentially increase straight line speed. Massa and Räikkönen said the performance of the Ferrari F2007 car would not be compromised in any way by the required modifications.
Tyre markings

The Malaysian race was the first at which the tyre compounds used on the cars were differentiated by a white stripe painted in the tyre treads. Since the beginning of the 2007 Formula One season, teams had been obliged to use two different kinds of tyre on each car during the race: a 'prime' tyre and an 'option' tyre. The prime tyre has a harder rubber compound and the option tyre a softer one. In general terms, a softer tyre is likely to grip better and provide a higher cornering speed. Conversely, a harder tyre will often be slower, but may last longer. Formula One cars typically use between two and four sets of tyres during a race and using harder tyres may allow fewer pit stops to change tyres. Track conditions, the car characteristics or driving style can reduce or even reverse these differences. In Australia two weeks earlier, the softer tyres were marked with a small white circle to facilitate understanding of each driver's tyre strategy, but commentators and spectators were unable to distinguish the two compounds even at slow speeds. The idea of the white stripe was tested during the test session a week before the Malaysian round of the season. The white stripe was applied with paint marker pens. Over the weekend 160 pens were used. Overall reaction to this system was positive, with the Williams team's technical director Sam Michael, who came up with the initial idea, calling it a "pretty good solution".

Friday drivers

Practice 
The race was preceded by three practice sessions. Ferrari's Felipe Massa set the pace in the first of two 90-minute practice sessions on Friday, with a time of 1:34.972, edging out McLaren's Fernando Alonso by three-tenths of a second. Alonso's teammate Hamilton was third, with Ferrari's other driver, Räikkönen, just behind in fourth. Nico Rosberg, Mark Webber, Jarno Trulli, Kazuki Nakajima, Ralf Schumacher, and Robert Kubica rounded out the top ten.

Massa was comfortably fastest in Friday's second practice, setting a time of 1:35.780. The Renault team improved dramatically from first practice, with Giancarlo Fisichella second and Kovalainen third. Räikkönen was again fourth, followed by Rosberg, Alexander Wurz, Kubica and Schumacher. The McLarens of Hamilton and Alonso dropped to ninth and 12th respectively. McLaren boss Ron Dennis played down the times, saying the team was concentrating on tyre evaluation.

Dennis's lack of concern was vindicated on Saturday, with Hamilton setting the fastest time in practice with a lap of 1:34.811. Massa finished the session a tenth of a second behind, with third placed Alonso a further half second behind. Kubica, Räikkönen, Rosberg and Heidfeld followed, with Super Aguri driver Anthony Davidson eighth fastest. Super Aguri are regarded as a sister team to the Honda F1 works team, who set only the 17th and 19th fastest times. The 2007 Super Aguri is widely thought to be an updated version of Honda's 2006 car.

Qualifying 

The qualifying session to determine the starting order for the race is held in three parts, six cars are eliminated after each of the first two parts. In the first part, the Spykers of Christijan Albers and Adrian Sutil set the slowest times of all. Spyker technical director Mike Gascoyne admitted that the team had "made a mistake" in missing the test at Sepang a week earlier. Scott Speed (STR), Anthony Davidson (Super Aguri), Rubens Barrichello (Honda) and Alex Wurz (Williams) were also eliminated. Davidson blamed STR driver Vitantonio Liuzzi for obstructing his qualifying lap, stating "he was pretty aware I was behind him". Wurz was slowed by gear-selection problems in his Williams. At the front, McLaren driver Alonso set the fastest time with a 1:34.942. His teammate Hamilton was second fastest, with the Ferraris third and fifth, split by Kubica's BMW.

Rain threatened during the second part. Although it did not materialise, all the drivers posted quick laps early on to avoid having to set a time on a wet track. Alonso was again fastest with a 1:34.057. Hamilton, both Ferraris, BMW Saubers, and Toyotas, as well as Rosberg (Williams) and Webber (Red Bull) also passed through to the final part. Kovalainen (Renault), Fisichella (Renault), Coulthard (Red Bull), Sato (Super Aguri), Button (Honda) and Liuzzi (STR) were eliminated. 2006 champions Renault failed to get either car into the final part. Team engineering director Pat Symonds noted that "...the overall level of performance is disappointing, but we now have to knuckle down and make the most of the situation we find ourselves in." Button claimed Honda's grid position of 15th was the "maximum we could possibly get".

In the final part of qualifying, Massa set the fastest time, taking pole position from second placed Alonso in the last few seconds as rain began to fall, with Räikkönen completing the top three. Massa's lap of 1:35.043 marked tyre company Bridgestone's 100th pole position in Formula One. Hamilton came fourth, over half a second behind the leading three. He conceded inexperience was to blame, saying that there were "some spots of rain on my visor, so I had to sort of let off". Heidfeld qualified fifth, ahead of Nico Rosberg in sixth and teammate Kubica in seventh. The Toyotas of Trulli and Schumacher were eighth and ninth, with Webber completing the top ten.

Race stewards initially imposed a 10-place penalty on Coulthard and Barrichello, for changing their engines prior to qualification. Since 2006, the engines of Formula One cars are required to last for two races. However, after further investigation they rescinded Coulthard's penalty, as he had retired from the previous race and his change had been made before the start of the race weekend. Barrichello's penalty stood.

Race

In contrast to the rain-affected practice and qualifying sessions, the track was dry for the duration of the race. All of the drivers except Jenson Button, Jarno Trulli and the two Red Bull drivers started on the softer option tyre. The first lap was eventful: Alonso started better than polesitter Massa and was able to take the inside line into turn one and gain the lead. Hamilton passed Räikkönen for third into the first corner, then drove round the outside of Massa into turn two to take second place. Meanwhile, the suspension on Adrian Sutil's Spyker failed at turn four, causing it to collide with Button's Honda and retire from the race. Button continued after making an early pitstop to repair the damage. Liuzzi and Sato also collided at turn four, causing Liuzzi to pit for a new front wing. After the race the drivers blamed each other for the incident.

During the early laps, Massa appeared to have a faster car than Hamilton, and repeatedly tried to pass the McLaren on the inside of turn four. His first attempt was on lap three, but Hamilton braked late and kept ahead of Massa into the following corner. Massa tried again at the same place on the next two laps. He passed Hamilton briefly into the turn on lap five, but overshot the corner and ran wide onto the grass. He dropped to fifth, behind teammate Räikkönen and BMW's Nick Heidfeld. Hamilton apologised after the race for 'tricking' Massa into the move. Albers, in the sole remaining Spyker, retired on lap nine with a gearbox fire.

While the two Ferraris were delayed behind Hamilton, Alonso was pulling away at the front, setting fastest laps on laps seven and fifteen. On lap 12, Robert Kubica was the first man to pit for fuel and fresh tyres, however he reported traction control problems four laps later and lost places. Alonso had extended his lead over Hamilton to 15 seconds by the first round of pitstops. He had experienced radio problems before refuelling, but these were fixed during the stop. The Renaults were circulating in eighth and tenth by the pit stops, with Fisichella ahead of Kovalainen. Button was one of the few drivers who started on the slower harder tyre and was dropping down the field, as Takuma Sato passed the Briton. All of the front runners were on the same tyre strategy, with Räikkönen being the first front runner to pit. He found himself behind Fisichella as he exited. A short pit stop by Hamilton enabled him to come out of the pits ahead of the Renault, leaving a car between himself and Räikkönen during the pit window. Heidfeld's late stop on lap 22 helped him stay ahead of Massa. The top five positions remained unchanged, however Hamilton's different strategy enabled him to escape Räikkönen and close in on leader Alonso at a second per lap. Despite pitting on lap 20, he set the fastest lap of the race on lap 22 in 1:36.701.

Kubica dropped to 13th as his traction control fault worsened, and a train of cars that wanted to pass developed behind him. Kovalainen's performance was much better than at the previous round in Melbourne, and he attempted to pass Jarno Trulli for eighth. The top five again remained the same after the second round of stops. However, Hamilton's short first stop necessitated a relatively early second stop, allowing Räikkönen to reduce the gap and Alonso to extend his lead to 18 seconds. Nico Rosberg, running in sixth place after the stops, was forced to retire with hydraulic problems on lap 43. David Coulthard also retired after problems with his brake pedal, the same problem that he experienced in the Friday practice session.

Alonso was able to extend his advantage in the closing stages, winning the race by 17 seconds. Although experiencing pressure from Räikkönen who was faster on the harder tyres, Hamilton was able to maintain second place behind Alonso, with Räikkönen claiming the final podium position. This was McLaren's first victory since the 2005 Japanese Grand Prix, and the team's first one-two since the 2005 Brazilian Grand Prix. Heidfeld and Massa secured fourth and fifth places respectively, 15 seconds behind Räikkönen. Heidfeld said later that beating Massa was "a fantastic experience". Fisichella finished sixth, and claimed it felt like a podium given the performance of the car. Trulli was seventh, and rookie Kovalainen scored his first F1 point in eighth. Wurz managed to come through from 19th to ninth, with his opening stint elevating him to 11th place by his first pit stop. Although he claimed no points, he said later "it bodes well for Williams's chances in the rest of the season". tenth placed Mark Webber was the final driver to finish on the same lap as the leaders. Honda finished outside the points in 11th and 12th, with Barrichello ahead of Button. Despite the problems Button said he believed the team had made "a small step forward". The Hondas were followed by Sato, Speed, Schumacher, Davidson and Liuzzi.

Alonso admitted he was surprised to win a race so early in his McLaren career, adding that winning for two different teams was very special. Hamilton said afterwards that this was his hardest race to date, while Räikkönen admitted he "did not have enough speed on the straight line to try to challenge either [Hamilton or Alonso]". Räikkönen also had to protect his engine from overheating, caused by a water-leak in the closing stages of the Melbourne race, with Räikkönen stating Ferrari had to "play on the safe side of that engine". After their disappointing Malaysian race, Ferrari boss Jean Todt stated that they "will try to do a better job" in the next round in Bahrain.

Classification

Qualifying

Notes:
 – Rubens Barrichello was given a ten-place grid penalty following an engine change.

Race

Championship standings after the race 

Drivers' Championship standings

Constructors' Championship standings

Note: Only the top five positions are included for both sets of standings.

References

External links

 Malaysian Grand Prix results (fia.com)
 Detailed Malaysian Grand Prix results
 Malaysian Grand Prix 2007 race review

Malaysian Grand Prix
Malaysian Grand Prix
Grand Prix
Malaysian Grand Prix